Fight Back! is an anarcho-punk collection album, by the band Oi Polloi, with the Oi Polloi songs from the old splits "Unlimited Genocide" with A.O.A. and "Skins 'N' Punks Volume Two" with Betrayed. This 1994 LP was released as a re-release of the old splits, but only with the Oi Polloi material.

Track listing
 Go Green
 You Cough/They Profit
 Punx Or Mice?
 Nuclear Waste
 The Only Release?
 Apartheid Stinx
 Boot Down The Door
 Americans Out
 Thugs In Uniform
 Pigs For Slaughter
 Rich Scumbag
 Never Give In

References

Oi Polloi albums
1994 compilation albums